John C. Sutherlin (born November 7, 1936, died May 12, 2018  ) was an American bridge player from Dallas, Texas. He won the North American Bridge Championships 12 times and received both the Fishbein Trophy and the Mott-Smith Trophy.

Bridge accomplishments

Awards

 Fishbein Trophy (1) 1993
 Mott-Smith Trophy (1) 1990

Wins

 North American Bridge Championships (12)
 von Zedtwitz Life Master Pairs (1) 1993 
 Nail Life Master Open Pairs (1) 1995 
 Grand National Teams (1) 2006 
 Jacoby Open Swiss Teams (1) 1990 
 Truscott Senior Swiss Teams (1) 2013 
 Vanderbilt (2) 1990, 1993 
 Senior Knockout Teams (2) 1994, 2003 
 Mitchell Board-a-Match Teams (1) 1983 
 Chicago Mixed Board-a-Match (1) 1976 
 Spingold (1) 1981

Runners-up

 World Mixed Pairs (1) 1982
 North American Bridge Championships
 Rockwell Mixed Pairs (2) 1962, 1994 
 Blue Ribbon Pairs (1) 1999 
 Grand National Teams (1) 1998 
 Jacoby Open Swiss Teams (1) 1991 
 Truscott Senior Swiss Teams (2) 2001, 2005 
 Vanderbilt (1) 1985 
 Senior Knockout Teams (1) 2010 
 Keohane North American Swiss Teams (2) 1982, 1996 
 Mitchell Board-a-Match Teams (2) 1967, 1997 
 Chicago Mixed Board-a-Match (1) 2005

Notes

External links

Living people
American contract bridge players
1936 births
Place of birth missing (living people)
Date of birth missing (living people)
People from Dallas